, also known as Miyazaki Bougainvillea Airport, is an international airport located  south southeast of Miyazaki, a city in the Miyazaki Prefecture of Japan.

The second floor has the head office of Solaseed Air.

Airlines and destinations

Access
The airport is connected to various locations by bus and taxi. Also, there is a railway line, the Miyazaki Kūkō Line, which connects the airport with the city center of Miyazaki and northern cities of the prefecture.

History
The airport opened in 1943 as an Imperial Japanese Navy base during World War II, and was a major base for "kamikaze" units beginning in February 1945, sending a total of 47 aircraft on suicide missions during operations such as the Battle of Okinawa.

In October 1969, All Nippon Airways Flight 104 overran a runway at Miyazaki Airport by 132 metres. All four crew and 49 passengers survived.

References

External links
 
 Miyazaki Airport Guide from Japan Airlines
 
 

Transport in Miyazaki Prefecture
Airports in Kyushu
Airport, Miyazaki
Buildings and structures in Miyazaki Prefecture
Airports established in 1943
1943 establishments in Japan